Fatal accidents to competitors on the Circuit de Spa-Francorchamps, Belgium during national and international  motor-sport events on the  circuit (1924–1978) and the shortened  Grand Prix circuit from 1979 onwards.

List of fatal accidents involving competitors

List of fatal accidents involving race officials

Sources

Spa-Francorchamps
Circuit de Spa-Francorchamps